Professor Miles Lewis  (born 1943, Amersham, UK) is an Australian academic serving as a Professor in the Faculty of Architecture, Building & Planning, at the University of Melbourne, Australia. He is one of Australia's most notable Architectural historians, and a member of the Order of Australia. He is a Fellow of the Australian Academy of the Humanities, a former President of Australia ICOMOS, of the Society of Architectural Historians Australia and New Zealand and of the Council for the Historic Environment. He is an immediate past President of the Town and Country Planning Association, and current Vice-President of the Comité International d’Architecture Vernaculaire (CIAV). He is a former member of the Administrative Appeals Tribunal, Victoria (now VCAT) and a former Auckland University Foundation Fellow. Professor Lewis has been a consultant on World Heritage listing and to the Getty Institute. He participated in the Tianjin Urban Conservation Study, China. He has many research interests include urban conservation, urban renewal, building history, prefabrication, vernacular architecture, and urban policy.

A well-known and forthright architectural historian and commentator on planning issues in the media, Professor Lewis has a number of useful databases online relating to architectural history and the history of building construction in Australia which are essential sources for others in the profession.

In 2013, Professor Lewis was awarded Honorary Life Membership of the National Trust of Australia (Victoria).

Selected publications

Books

 Lewis, Miles 2021. Architectural Drawings: Collecting in Australia. Melbourne: Melbourne Books.
 Lewis MB. 1999. Suburban backlash: the battle for the world's most liveable city. Melbourne: Bloomings Books.
 Lewis MB. 1994. Melbourne: the city's history and development. Melbourne: City of Melbourne.
 Lewis MB [ed]. 1991. Victorian churches. Melbourne: National Trust of Australia ( Victoria).
 Lewis MB [ed]. 1988. Two hundred years of concrete in Australia. North Sydney: Concrete Institute of Australia.
 Lewis MB. 1983. The essential Maldon. Richmond, Vic: Greenhouse in association with the National Trust of Australia (Victoria),
 Lewis MB. 1977. Don John of Balaclava. Melbourne: Brian Atkins.
 Lewis MB. 1977. Victorian primitive. Carlton, Vic: Greenhouse Publications.

External links
 Staff webpage at the University of Melbourne
 Personal webpage
 Link to Miles Lewis data base page

References
 Who invented the Hill's hoist? ABC TV 22/8/04
 Universities demanding foreign students be passed, ABC TV 7:30 Report, 20/2/07
 Protesters get tunnel vision as Smith St becomes a test case, 23/6/04
 Collingwood Action Group report, edited by Miles Lewis, 17/8/04
 Boulton, M, 26/8/05, The Age, What would it take to make Melbourne a more liveable city?

Australian architectural historians
Australian architecture writers
University of Melbourne alumni
1943 births
Living people
Historians of Australia
20th-century Australian architects
20th-century Australian historians
21st-century Australian architects
21st-century Australian historians
Members of the Order of Australia